Kuhl's pipistrelle (Pipistrellus kuhlii) is a species of vesper bat that occurs in large areas of North Africa, Southern Europe and West Asia. It lives in temperate forests, subtropical or tropical dry shrubland, Mediterranean-type shrubby vegetation, temperate grassland, rural gardens, and urban areas. It is a rare and infrequent visitor to Britain, usually only detected by sound-recordings.

Taxonomy
Kuhl's pipistrelle was first named in 1817, under the name Vespertilio kuhlii, in a work by Heinrich Kuhl entitled  ("The bats of Germany"). The specific epithet was chosen by Johann Natterer, who had collected the first specimens, and commemorates Kuhl; under the rules of the ICZN, however, Kuhl himself is regarded as the authority, as the first to report the name.

The population of Algeria, Egypt, Libya, Sudan was formerly known as Pipistrellus deserti. This taxon is now considered to be a junior synonym of Pipistrellus kuhlii

References

External links

Pipistrellus
Taxa named by Heinrich Kuhl
Bats of Africa
Bats of Asia
Bats of Europe
Mammals of North Africa
pipistrelle, Kuhls
Mammals of Azerbaijan
Mammals of Afghanistan
Mammals of Pakistan
Mammals of Cape Verde
Mammals described in 1817
Taxonomy articles created by Polbot